The Corogea is a right tributary of the river Prut in Romania. It discharges into the Prut near Ilișeni, on the border with Moldova.

References

Rivers of Romania
Rivers of Botoșani County
Tributaries of the Prut